Thomas Lethbridge may refer to:

 T. C. Lethbridge (Thomas Charles Lethbridge, 1901–1971), English archaeologist, parapsychologist, and explorer
 Thomas Lethbridge (Royal Navy officer) (1829–1892)
 Sir Thomas Lethbridge, 2nd Baronet (1778–1849), MP for Somerset
 Sir Thomas Lethbridge, 7th Baronet (born 1950) of the Lethbridge baronets